Turkey competed at the 1992 Winter Olympics in Albertville, France.

Competitors

Alpine skiing

Men

Cross-country skiing

Men

1 Starting delay based on 10 km results. 
C = Classical style, F = Freestyle

References
Official Olympic Reports
 Olympic Winter Games 1992, full results by sports-reference.com

Nations at the 1992 Winter Olympics
1992
1992 in Turkish sport